Manny Robles III is an American professional boxer from Los Angeles.

Robles fought Xu Can for the WBA (Regular) featherweight world title, losing by unanimous decision.

He is the NABF featherweight title holder.

Robles also has a win over former title challenger Christian Esquivel.

References

External links

Living people
Sportspeople from Los Angeles County, California
Featherweight boxers
Boxers from California
American male boxers
Year of birth missing (living people)